Olentangy Park was a trolley park, a type of amusement park, in Clintonville, Columbus, Ohio, operating from 1880 to 1937.

Location
Olentangy Park was located in what is now the southwest corner of Clintonville. The park boundaries on its west and east sides were the Olentangy River and north High Street, North Street on the south, and nearly to West Tulane Road on the north.

History

Robert M. Turner (1880–1895)
Prior to 1880, Olentangy Park was a wooded area on the Olentangy River which was popular for picnics and swimming. There was a mill in the area north of Ackerman Road. In 1880, Robert M. Turner purchased the area. The first development of this property was the building of a formal picnic ground and swimming area in 1881. Then a tavern was built on the site and Turner renamed it "The Villa." Between 1881 and 1895, little changed. A few small amusement rides, a carousel, and possibly some pony rides were added.

Columbus Railway, Power and Light Company

In 1895, the Columbus Railway, Power and Light Company purchased "The Villa" at the northern end of the company's North High Street trolley line. The company hoped to use the park to increase the ridership on the weekend. Electric lighting was added to the park in 1896. That same year, the company held a naming contest resulting in the park being named "Olentangy Park" by an anonymous "Volunteer."

The Dusenbury brothers (1899–1929)
In 1899, around 50 acres were purchased by the Dusenbury brothers of New Lexington, Ohio. They immediately added a large casino with a theater just north of the ravine, more bowling alleys, and a fun house attraction called the "Crystal Maze." Later, they built a "Water Toboggan" and a roller coaster called "The Figure Eight." The 1904 World's Fair was held in St. Louis. At its conclusion, the Dusenbury brothers purchased the "Japanese Gardens" exhibit and installed it at Olentangy Park as "Fair Japan." In 1907, they opened the second Dancing Pavilion, expanding it in 1914 and 1920, making it the largest in the state.

A formal picnic area was cleared in the ravine which separated the north and south ends of the park. Wooden walking bridges were built over the ravines connecting the Park's various points. By 1910, the brothers had added considerably to Olentangy Park. A zoo with monkeys, bears, and elephants was built near the Park's southern end. A boat house, known later named the "Canoe Club," was constructed along the banks of the Olentangy River. Visitors could rent a canoe or electric Naphtha launch for a quiet afternoon of boating on the Olentangy. A Mideway was constructed along the northern end of the Park which featured rows of enclosed rides and attractions such as "The Olde Mill," "Love's Voyage," and "The Temple of Mirth." A restaurant replaced the tavern. Electric lighting was added throughout the Park. The North High Street Trolley was diverted into the Park. Trolleys could exit North High Street at North Street, travel through a large "castle gate" and arrive at the Park's exclusive trolley stop. Olentangy Park became one of a growing number of "Trolley parks" becoming more common at the time in the United States. Visitors could reach such a park from every corner of their city.

From the late 1900s, Olentangy Park grew rapidly. Some of the park's most famous rides were installed in this period. One such ride was the "Loop the Loop" in 1908. It was one of America's first looping roller coasters. It was removed sometime around 1913 because it placed too much physical stress on its riders. Others included the "Whirlwind," "Over-the-Top" (which later became "The Racer") and the "Scenic Coaster" (which later became the "Red Devil"). The "Red Devil" was built feet from North High Street. Riders soared dozens of feet above the west side of the road. A Ferris wheel, Circle Swing and pony rides were also installed at the park. "Shoot-the-Chutes," added in 1909, was a tall water slide added in the center of the park's north end. Riders boarded a wide, flat-bottomed boat that traveled up a side chute, then shot down the slide. It made a large wave that showered riders and spectators. An elephant was trained to ride down the slide. 

In 1914, a Mangels-Illions carousel was purchased for the Park. It had 52 horses and 2 chariots, hand carved by the Lithuanian master carousel carver Marcus C. Illions and Sons. This "Grand Carousel" was one of only a few manufactured by the William F. Mangels Company. According to the Franklin County Recorder, Joseph Dusenbury and his wife, Ada, gave some land to the Olentangy Park Company in 1915. Joseph gave even more land in 1917, allowing for the park's expansion.

A significant addition to Olentangy Park was the country's second-largest swimming pool which was constructed near the theatre in 1917. The pool was 325 feet by 95 feet. It was able to accommodate 5,000 bathers. In an effort to simulate an "ocean side setting", such as that found in New Jersey, hundreds of tons of sand were trucked in and dumped around the pool's edges to create a beach. Development of the park placed financial strain on the Dusenbury brothers. This was complicated by poor custom in the 1923 season. The Dusenbury brothers sold Olentangy Park to "The Olentangy Amusement Company," a group of investors. It was placed under the management of Max Stern. The investors continued to operate the Park successfully through the remainder of the 1920s. However, there was little further development by them.

Leo and Elmer Heanlein (1929–1937)
In 1929, the brothers Leo and Elmer Heanlein purchased the park. They expanded the zoo and added the Mysterious Sensation, a fun house attraction, to the Midway, and experimented with short-term attractions like the "Lindy-Loop" and "Flight Tutors." They ultimately closed the park during the Great Depression.

L.L. LeVeque Company (1938–1939)
In 1938, the L.L. LeVeque Company purchased Olentangy Park and sold the park's rides and equipment. The Gooding Amusement Company, which also owned the Columbus Zoo and Aquarium, purchased the carousel, the  Ferris wheel, the airplane ride, the dodgem cars and the rifle range. Many of the rides were relocated to the Wyandot Lake Amusement Park. Olentangy Park closed at the end of its 1937 season. Instead, LeVeque demolished the park and opened Olentangy Village Apartments on  March 26, 1939.

Olentangy Park remnants
In 1940, a bowling alley, the Olentangy Lanes, was constructed on the site of the Park's parking lot. It was destroyed by fire on Oct. 27, 1980. The park's "castle gate" and theatre remained until 1940. Both were destroyed by fires. The only remaining building is the park's office and zoo keeper's quarters. The stone building is located at the curve of North Street. It has been divided into six apartments.
Some of the Park's original wrought iron fencing can still be seen along the northern side of North Street from High Street to the curve at the stone office house. This fencing, with its distinctive "O" pattern, was duplicated in the 1950s along North High Street. The same portion of North Street was the Park's original walk up entrance.
The foundation of the Park's "Canoe Club" and the steps that once led up to the Park's theatre are partly hidden in the banks of the Olentangy River, north of Ackerman Road. The concrete foundations of the wooden walking bridges crossing the picnic ravines are visible on either side of the ravine's streams. The former picnic ravine itself is located behind a tanning salon on North High Street. It is overgrown and filled with garbage.

The 1914 Mangels-Illions carousel
Olentangy Park's 1914 Mangels-Illions carousel was moved in the 1930s to Scioto Ranch Park, the location that later became part of Wyandot Lake Amusement Park near the Columbus Zoo. It continued to operate, though in deteriorating condition. In 1999 it was removed from Wyandot Lake and Carousel Works Inc. was commissioned to undertake a costly restoration. The carousel resumed operation in spring 2000, housed in a climate controlled building at the Columbus Zoo and Aquarium. There, in the first month of operation, 42,000 customers paid $1 each to ride it. 
On July 28, 2004, the carousel celebrated its one millionth rider since being restored and moved to the zoo.

Swimming pool
The Olentangy Park swimming pool added in 1917 survived for decades even after the closure of the park as a functioning part of the Olentangy Village apartment complex. In 1996, the pool was reduced to half its former size to make room for new apartment buildings, and finally, in 2002, the remainder of the pool was filled in to create new village space.

See also
Indianola Park
Minerva Park

References

External links

Defunct amusement parks in Ohio
Demolished buildings and structures in Columbus, Ohio
19th century in Columbus, Ohio
1880 establishments in Ohio
1937 disestablishments in Ohio
20th century in Columbus, Ohio
Clintonville (Columbus, Ohio)